Religion in Moldova is predominantly Orthodox Christian. The Constitution of the Republic of Moldova provides for freedom of religion, and the national government generally respects this right in practice.

Although Eastern Orthodoxy has a numerical preponderance, there is no state religion, and state and church are officially separate.

The generally amicable relationship among religions in Moldovan society contributes to religious freedom; however, disputes among various branches of the Orthodox Church continue.

Other religions practiced in Moldova include Judaism.

Religions

Eastern Orthodox Church

The primary religion is Christianity, 90.1% of the population nominally being Eastern Orthodox according to data of the 2014 census. Administratively, there are two autonomous churches belonging to two autocephalous churches (Russian and Romanian) within the Eastern Orthodox communion. The autonomous Metropolis of Chişinău and Moldova (belonging to the Russian Orthodox Church), according to the State Service on Religious Issues, has 1,194 parishes; the autonomous Metropolis of Bessarabia (belonging to the Romanian Orthodox Church) has 124 parishes. Besides followers of the Russian Orthodox Old-Rite Church (Old Believers) make up approximately 0.09% of the population.

The religious traditions of Eastern Orthodoxy are entwined with the culture and patrimony of the country. Many self-professed atheists routinely celebrate religious holidays, cross themselves, and even light candles and kiss icons if local tradition and the occasion demand.

During the 2004 census, 93.34% of the population declared themselves to be Eastern Orthodox.

Catholic Church

Moldova forms a single diocese, the Roman Catholic Diocese of Chişinău. It is not part of any ecclesiastical province, and therefore depends directly upon the Holy See for Metropolitan authority. About 0.5% of Moldovans adhere to the Catholic faith.

Other faiths
Adherents of other faiths include Baptists, Pentecostals, Seventh-day Adventists, Muslims, Jehovah's Witnesses, Baháʼís, Jews, Unification Church members, Molokans (a Russian group), Messianic Jews (who believe that Jesus was the Messiah), Lutherans, Presbyterians, Hare Krishnas, and some other charismatic Christian and evangelical Christian groups. The Church of Jesus Christ of Latter-day Saints (Mormons) has 3 congregations in the country, and a combined total of approximately 370 members. According to the most recently available numbers, the Jewish community has approximately 31,300 members, including approximately 20,000 living in Chişinău, around 3,100 in Bălți and surrounding areas, approximately 2,200 in Tiraspol, and around 2,000 in Bender.

Freedom of religion

The Constitution provides for freedom of religion, and the Government generally respects this right in practice; however, the 1992 Law on Religions, which codifies religious freedoms, contains restrictions that inhibit the activities of unregistered religious groups. Although the law was amended in 2002, many of the restrictions remain in place. The law provides for freedom of religious practice, including each person's right to profess his or her religion in any form. It also protects the confidentiality of the confessional, allows denominations to establish associations and foundations, and states that the Government may not interfere in the religious activities of denominations. The law specifies that "to organize and function", religious organizations must be registered with the Government, and unregistered groups may not own property, engage employees, or obtain space in public cemeteries in their own names.

Attitudes towards religion
According to a survey conducted in 2014, by the Institute of Public Policy in Moldova, 80% of the respondents show a high degree of trust in the Church as an institution, but 85% consider that the church should remain separate from the political sphere and 76% consider that the church should not become involved with governmental issues.

Also, the survey showed that 58% of the respondents go to church less than once per month and 10% do not go at all.

Church and state
Although the Constitution declares the separation of church and state, the Moldovan Orthodox Church (Metropolis of Chișinău and All Moldova under the Russian Orthodox Church) is sometimes active in political debate.

In June 2010 Metropolitan Vladimir featured in the campaign advertisements of Valeriu Pasat, apparently endorsing his candidacy.

In October 2015 the same Orthodox Church leveraged its authority in a failed attempt to influence the trial of former prime minister Vlad Filat, who was accused of passive corruption and traffic of influence.

In December 2015 the Metropolis of Chișinău and All Moldova challenged the State Tax Service of the Republic of Moldova, refusing to provide revenue reports, although religious organizations lost their tax-exempt status in 2013.

In 2016, on the eve of the first round of the presidential elections, metropolitan bishop Vladimir called on church members to cast their votes for Igor Dodon, the pro-Russian leader of the Party of Socialists of the Republic of Moldova. A group of Moldovan clergy of the same church, headed by bishop Marchel, later called on citizens to vote for Igor Dodon in the November election runoff, stating that the Socialist candidate supported the Orthodox Church, while his competitor Maia Sandu would fight against it.

See also
Baháʼí Faith in Moldova
Eastern Orthodoxy in Moldova
History of the Jews in Moldova
Islam in Moldova
Religion by country
Catholic Church in Moldova
Protestantism in Moldova
Slavic Neopaganism

References

The article is based on a 2004 public domain USDoS webpage. Breadcrumb trail: USDoS Bureau of Democracy, Human Rights, and Labor > Releases  >  International Religious Freedom  >  2004  >  Europe and Eurasia > Moldova

External links